Hvolsvöllur is a small town in the south of Iceland about 106 km to the east of Reykjavík.

Overview
The name of the town literally translates to "Hillfield".   (  in the genitive case) is an archaic form of the modern Icelandic word  , meaning "hill", and   means "field". The name is derived from the name of the historic farm  ("Stórólfur's hill").

The hringvegur (road no.1) traverses the town which has 1036 inhabitants. In the surrounding areas there is an additional population of about 800 people, who are also part of the municipality.

Not far from Hvolsvöllur are an airfield and a port (Landeyjahöfn ) that offer transportation to Vestmannaeyjar (Westman Islands).

The area is the scene of one of the most well-known sagas of Iceland, Njál's saga. The town of Hvolsvöllur has a Saga Centre dedicated to this and other Icelandic sagas.

In 2010, the volcanic eruptions at Eyjafjallajökull caused evacuations in the surrounding area, with people being relocated to Hvolsvöllur, where Red Cross mass care centres had been set up.

  is a Protestant church in Hvolsvöllur. It was built in 1930 and can seat 120 people. The interior was painted in 1955. Above the altar there is a painting by Þórarin B. Þorláksson, a famous Icelandic painter, dating from 1914 which shows Jesus blessing the children.

Climate
Similar to the rest of the southern coast of Iceland, Hvolsvöllur has a subpolar oceanic climate (Köppen: Cfc) with cool summers and cold winters, although relatively mild for its high latitude. Precipitation is abundant year round, with October usually seeing the most precipitation.

Sports
Ungmennafélagið Hekla

See also
List of cities in Iceland

References

Populated places in Southern Region (Iceland)